The DECi-hertz Interferometer Gravitational wave Observatory (or DECIGO) is a proposed Japanese, space-based, gravitational wave observatory. The laser interferometric gravitational wave detector is so named because it is designed to be most sensitive in the frequency band between 0.1 and 10 Hz, filling in the gap between the sensitive bands of LIGO and LISA. Its precursor mission, B-DECIGO, is currently planned for launch in the 2030s, with DECIGO launching at some time afterward.

The design is similar to LISA, with four zero-drag satellite clusters (two colocated) in a triangular arrangement, but using a smaller separation of only 1000 km whose relative displacements are measured by a Fabry–Pérot Michelson interferometer.

Description
The DECi-hertz Interferometer Gravitational wave Observatory (DECIGO) is a proposed Japanese, space-based, gravitational wave observatory. The first mention of the observatory as "DECIGO" was in a presentation given by Naoki Seto, Kawamura, and Takashi Nakamura at a September 2001 meeting of the Physical Society of Japan at Okinawa International University. 

It was designed as a follow-up project to KAGRA by the Japanese Gravitational Wave Community (JGWC), and it is currently planned to be launched in 2027. A 2008 paper in the Journal of Physics: Conference Series in 2008, authored by 135 scientists headed by Kawamura, went into significantly more detail, describing the basic initial design ideas. It is designed to be most sensitive in the frequency band between 0.1 and 10 Hz, which better detects gravity waves in the gap between the sensitivity bands of LIGO and LISA.

Three of the clusters will be spaced equally around the Sun, and the other will be placed in the same location as one of the others. The placement is designed to facilitate "correlation signals for the detection of primordial gravitational waves". It is planned to launch an unspecified time following B-DECIGO, which has a projected launch sometime in the 2030s.

B-DECIGO
B-DECIGO is a preliminary test of various technologies to be used in DECIGO. , it is planned for launch in the 2030s.

See also
 Laser Interferometer Space Antenna (LISA)
 List of proposed space observatories

References

External links
DECIGO home page (English)

Space telescopes
Interferometric gravitational-wave instruments
Astronomy in Japan
Proposed spacecraft
Satellites of Japan
2027 in science